Waverton is any of the following places:
Waverton, Cheshire, a civil parish in Cheshire, England.
Waverton, Cumbria, a civil parish in Cumbria, England.
Waverton, New South Wales, a suburb of Sydney, Australia.